My Life in Versailles is an animated short film directed by Clémence Madeleine-Perdrillat and Nathaniel H'Limi and released in 2019, it won the jury prize at the Annecy International Animated Film Festival the same year. This film is starting point of a serie of five 26-minute-long episodes and a children illustrated book.

Plot 
As a shy little girl, eight-year-old Violette loses her parents in a bomb attack in Paris. From now on, she will live with her uncle Régis, a maintenance agent at the Palace of Versailles. Violette hates him: she thinks he stinks. So she decides she won't say a word to him. The stubborn little girl and the big bear will tame each other and together get through their grief.

Voice cast 
Jemma Wilcox as Violette
 Saul Jephcott as Regis
 Charlotte Rampling as Geneviève
Margeaux Lampley as Olga, parents, kids
 David Coburn as Mr Angel, funeral Director, guide
 Owen de la Hoyde as Malcolm
 Barbara Weber-Scaff as the teacher, parents, kids

Wins 
The main awards received by the film include:
France - Jury prize for a TV special at the 2019 edition of the Annecy International Animation Film Festival
France - Prix de la compétition Jeune Public & Prix Unifrance Jeune Public du Festival international du film en plein air de Grenoble
 France - Prix des enfants Courts des Petits - Premiers Plans d’Angers  
 France - Best Animated Short Film for Kids - Imaginaria
 France - Coup de cœur pour une oeuvre audiovisuelle Association Les femmes s’Animent - Festival national du film d’animation  
 France - Réanimania  Film Festival : Mention spéciale du Jury Festival Anima • Best Tv & educational Film
 France - Les enfants terribles de Huy : Coup de Cœur du public - Coup de cœur du jury jeune - coup de cœur de 6NEMA
 France - Prix du Meilleur Film d’Animation One Country One Film
 USA - New-York International Children Festival : New York International Children’s Audience Award • NYICFF “Grown-Ups” Best Short Film Award • NYICFF Grand Prize Short Film Award
 USA - Chicago International Children’s Film Festival : Best TV Award Professional and Children Jury
 USA - Best Animation Short - Dell-IKFF  
 Germany - Tricks for Kids Award - Stuttgart International Festival of Animated Film
 Portugal - IndieJunior Audience Award
 Italy - Best animated Short Film for Kids Imaginaria

References

External links 
 
 La Vie de château on Annecy International Animated Film Festival's website

2019 films
2019 animated films
2019 computer-animated films
2019 short films
French animated short films
2010s French films